Suhi, a very old North Indian raga.: it also appears in the Sikh tradition from northern India and forms part of the Guru Granth Sahib. In the Guru Granth Sahib, the composition appear in 60 ragas and this is the thirty first raga to appear in the series. The composition in this raga first appear on page number 728.

Raag Suhi (ਸੂਹੀ) – Suhi is an expression of such devotion that the listener experiences feelings of extreme closeness and undying love. The listener is bathed in that love and genuinely learns what it means to adore.

Raga Suhi was favoured for religious events and is found in many ancient articles on music. Suhi is a rare but popular concert raga today and is considered one of the most famous from among the North Indian classical system. It is traditionally performed at sunraise. Guru Nanak, Guru Amar Das, Guru Ram Das, Guru Arjan and Bhagats have composed sacred hymns (Shabads) to be accompanied with this raga. It accompanies about 143 Shabads.

 Aroh: sa re ga, ma pa, ni dha ni, sa
 Avroh: sa ni dha, pa ma ga re sa
 Pakad: sa, re ga ma pa, pa ma ga , re ga , re, sa
 Vadi: pa
 Samvadi: sa

See also 
 Kirtan

References

External links 
 Shree Raag Gurbani Vichar

Shree
Ragas in the Guru Granth Sahib